Zhang Juzheng (26 May 1525 – 9 July 1582), courtesy name Shuda, pseudonym Taiyue, was a Chinese politician who served as Senior Grand Secretary in the late Ming dynasty during the reigns of the Longqing and Wanli emperors. He represented what might be termed the "new Legalism", aiming to ensure that the gentry worked for the state. Alluding to performance evaluations, he said: "Everyone is talking about real responsibility, but without a clear reward and punishment system, who is going to risk life and hardship for the country?" One of his chief goals was to reform the gentry and rationalize the bureaucracy together with his political rival Gao Gong, who was concerned that offices were providing income with little responsibility. Taking the Hongwu Emperor as his standard and ruling as de facto Prime Minister, Zhang's true historical significance comes from his centralization of existing reforms, positioning the reformative agency of the state over that of the gentry—the "Legalist" idea of the sovereignty of the state. 

The Wanli Emperor deeply respected Zhang as a mentor and valued minister. During the first ten years of the Wanli era, the Ming dynasty's economy and military power prospered in a way not seen since the Yongle Emperor and the Rule of Ren and Xuan from 1402 to 1435. However, after Zhang's death, the Wanli Emperor felt free to act independently, and reversed many of Zhang's administrative improvements.

Biography

Early career
Zhang Juzheng was born in Jiangling County, in modern–day Jingzhou, Hubei province, in 1525, and was renowned for his intelligence at an early age, passing the county shengyuan examinations at the age of 12 and enrolling for the provincial juren examinations the next year, where the chief examiner failed him to prevent his becoming complacent. Finally, in 1547, he passed the imperial examination and was appointed as an editor in the Hanlin Academy.

Zhang was embroiled in deep political turmoil from the start of his career, owing to the factionalism prevalent in the Ming bureaucracy at the time. He was one of few officials who had cordial relations with both Yan Song and Xu Jie, the leaders of the respective factions, but eventually assisted Xu in overthrowing Yan Song. Subsequently, under Xu's patronage, Zhang became a Privy Secretary in 1567, outlasting Xu himself and sharing power with his political rival Gao Gong. In 1572, shortly after the accession of the Wanli Emperor, Gao was ejected from office by Zhang and his ally, the eunuch Feng Bao, on charges that he had questioned the ability of the child emperor to rule. This left Zhang as the sole Grand Secretary, in effect controlling the entire Ming bureaucracy during the first ten years of the Wanli era.

As Senior Grand Secretary
Zhang's reforms consisted primarily of fiscal measures in order to address the persistent revenue shortages that plagued the government. At the same time, laws were instituted from 1573 onwards to tighten monitoring and assessment of officials, in an attempt to restore discipline to an increasingly corrupt bureaucracy. Other major measures included the large–scale retrenchment of officials to achieve savings, as well as efforts to reclaim tax–exempt lands and expand the revenue base. In 1580 the single whip law was instituted, commuting all taxes and labour obligations into silver payments, while an empire–wide land survey was also ordered.

In military affairs, Zhang promoted and supported competent generals such as Qi Jiguang in order to strengthen the empire's northern borders.

Zhang also played a very important role as mentor and regent during the early years of the reign of the Wanli Emperor. He strongly influenced and guided the emperor through his teenage years. However, the strict upbringing he imposed on the emperor also aroused resentment, while his attempts to centralise government and improve its finances affected the interests of large sections of the bureaucracy, leading to frequent controversy. One example of this was the death of Zhang's father in 1577; normally this would have obliged Zhang to enter filial mourning (according to Confucianist tradition) and leave his post, but Zhang applied to remain in office, and was retained by the emperor. In the subsequent dispute over the propriety of Zhang's actions, several opposing officials were subjected to punishment by caning, which only increased the impression of Zhang's domineering nature.

Zhang's fiscal policies met with only mixed success, due to the institutional resistance to his reforms. While the fiscal situation of the imperial government was much improved, and the coffers were refilled with silver, most of the reforms he instituted either failed to achieve their aims, such as the empire-wide land survey, or were quickly discarded after his death in 1582. At the same time, his luxurious lifestyle—which included meals with over a hundred dishes, and a palanquin carried by 32 men—exposed him to charges of hypocrisy even as he imposed austerity measures on the rest of the bureaucracy.

After his death, Zhang's political opponents quickly accused him and his supporter Feng Bao of several major charges, including corruption, embezzlement, and factionalism (党争). As a result, his family was purged and his wealth and estate confiscated on the Wanli Emperor's orders, while several of his political allies were forced to retire. Zhang's reputation would only be rehabilitated more than half a century later, just before the downfall of the Ming dynasty.

Zhang's commentary on the "Four Books"
In 1573, Zhang presented the Wanli Emperor with a commentary on the Four Books of the Confucian canon, entitled  "Colloquial Commentary on the Four Books" ("四书直解", Sì Shū Zhíjie). It was published some time between 1573 and 1584. The book was not destroyed during the posthumous disgrace of Zhang, and even enjoyed a measure of renown among the Chinese literati almost a century later, during the early decades of the Qing dynasty, when several editions of it appeared between 1651 and 1683.

In the assessment of modern scholars (e.g. D.E. Mungello), Zhang's commentary was, in its content and meaning, not that different from the commentary written by Neo–Confucianist Zhu Xi. The Jesuits rejected the Neo–Confucianism but found Zhang's book more consonant with their view of Confucius' teaching. As a result, there are numerous references to Zhang's work in Confucius Sinarum philosophus, the pioneering Latin translation and commentary of the Confucian classics, which had been gradually created by a large group of Jesuits over several decades and published in Paris in 1687.

Literature
Zhang Juzheng (Chang Chü–cheng) is an important character in Ray Huang's 1587, a Year of No Significance, a documentary book on the period. Zhang is also a main character in Chinese televesion series Ming Dynasty in 1566.

See also

 Grand Secretary

External links
 Encyclopædia Britannica

References

1525 births
1582 deaths
Senior Grand Secretaries of the Ming dynasty
People from Jingzhou
Royal tutors
Chinese reformers